Electro-stimulation is stimulation using electricity.  

It can be used in the context of:
 Animal husbandry as part of the artificial insemination process
 Bioelectromagnetics
 Cranial electrotherapy stimulation
 Transcranial magnetic stimulation
 Electrical muscle stimulation
 Bio-electric stimulation therapy
 Functional electrical stimulation
 Erotic electrostimulation, sometimes a form of BDSM

Neurotechnology
Former disambiguation pages converted to set index articles